Pyzheyevo is a rural locality (a village) in Sizemskoye Rural Settlement, Sheksninsky District, Vologda Oblast, Russia. The population was 22 as of 2002.

Geography 
Pyzheyevo is located 65 km north of Sheksna (the district's administrative centre) by road. Florida is the nearest rural locality.

References 

Rural localities in Sheksninsky District